Walton Beach may refer to:

 Fort Walton Beach, Florida
The beaches of Walton County, Florida on the Emerald Coast
 Walton-on-the-Naze, UK